Sympathy in Summer is a 1971 film directed by Antony I. Ginnane when he was a 19-year-old university student. It was partly financed by Melbourne University Film Society and was heavily financed by the films of Jean-Luc Godard, François Truffaut and Alain Resnais.

Premise
Lenny is a young womanising university student who is not as confident as he appears. He recalls his relationship with his girlfriend Anne and imagines Carlton as a Bohemian Paris.

Cast
Connie Simmons as Anne Benton
Vincent Griffith as Lenny Marshall
Tony Horler as the other man
Robin Wells as the perfect woman
Pam McAlister as Candy
John Caust
Marlene Schulenberg
Leon Boyle

Production
The film was shot in 1968 but not released until 1971 by which time Ginnane had established himself as a distributor. It only received a limited release.

Legacy
The film is markedly different in genre from the movies Ginnane would later make when he became a producer.

Footage from the movie appeared in the documentary Carlton + Godard = Cinema (2003).

References

External links

Sympathy in Summer at Oz Movies

1971 films
Australian drama films
Films shot in Melbourne
1970s English-language films
1970s Australian films